Trentino Volley is a professional Italian volleyball team based in Trento, in northern Italy. It plays in the Italian Volleyball League without interruption since 2000. It has won four times the Italian Volleyball League, the Italian Cup, the Italian Super Cup, three consecutive times the CEV Champions League and a record four consecutive times the FIVB Men's Club World Volleyball Championship. In the 2010–11 season it won national, continental and world championship. It was the first team in volleyball history to have done that. 

Trentino Volley is a Joint stock company, and its president is Diego Mosna. The company has a budget of 4,500,000 euros and about 225 employees. The actions of the company was awarded at continental level with the acknowledgment Testimonial of the Year at the Sport Business Ambitions Awards 2010 and the awarding of the 2010–11 Champions League Final Four, held at PalaOnda, Bolzano.

Achievements

 CEV Champions League
  (×3) 2009, 2010, 2011
  (×3) 2016, 2021, 2022
  (×1) 2012
 CEV Cup
  (×1) 2019
  (×2) 2015, 2017
 FIVB Club World Championship
  (×5) 2009, 2010, 2011, 2012, 2018
  (×1) 2022
  (×3) 2013, 2016, 2021
 Italian Championship
  (×4) 2008, 2011, 2013, 2015
  (×4) 2009, 2010, 2012, 2017
 Italian Cup
  (×3) 2010, 2012, 2013
  (×6) 2011, 2015, 2016, 2017, 2022, 2023
 Italian SuperCup
  (×3) 2011, 2013, 2021
  (×5) 2008, 2010, 2012, 2015, 2018

History

Trentino Volley was founded on 23 May 2000; and two days later, it purchased the rights to play in the Serie A1 (Italy's First Division) from Ravenna, that had retired due to financial problems. The club played its first Serie A1 match in Parma on 15 October 2000 against Maxicono Parma, and was defeated 3–0. The first home match of the Trentino Volley was played on 22 October 2000 against Padova, and the home team came out victorious with a result of 3–2.
Trentino Volley are by far the most successful side in the history of the FIVB Volleyball Men’s Club World Championship, having won the title a total of four times.
However, the Italian club, founded in 2000 and based in the city of Trento in the northeast of the country, only managed a bronze in 2013, were knocked out during pool play in 2014 (ending up 5th) and missed out on the 2015 edition of the competition.
During its first two seasons, the team managed a tenth, and a ninth place finish at the end of the regular season.

Players acquired by the team in his first Italian Serie A years included Lorenzo Bernardi and Andrea Sartoretti. In the summer of 2007 Trentino Volley made substantial purchases, as part of a strategy that would focus on a young team with talented players, such as Serbian Nikola Grbić, Bulgarians Vladimir Nikolov and Matey Kaziyski and Italian Emanuele Birarelli. Itas Trentino Diatec ended the following regular season with a first-place finish, and stepped into the finals. On 7 May 2008 Trentino Volley defeated Piacenza 3–0, to win its first national championship title, and gain access to the CEV Champions League 2008–2009.

Trento run undefeated in the pool stages, with a first-place finish in Group E. On 5 April 2009, at the O2 Arena in Prague, Trento defeated Iraklis Thessaloniki 3–1 in the final.
In 2009, the team flew to Doha (Qatar), to compete in the FIVB Men's Club World Volleyball Championship. On Sunday 8 November Trentino Betclic won the final, with a score of 3–0 against the Poles of Skra Bełchatów, and became FIVB Club World Champion. In 2010, it won the Italian Cup and then successfully defended its Champions League title with a 3–0 victory (25–12, 25–20, 25–21) over Dynamo Moscow.

Former names

Symbols

Club logos and brand names are composed of a red ball. The eagle is the symbol of the club, Autonomous province of Trento is the club's flag.

Trentino Volley unveiled their new logo on 4 July 2022 after sticking with the same for some 22 years. The new logo is to specifically for a digital and young audience. The aim is to make TRENTINO Volley more interesting and captivating, with a focus on the actual name of the club – summarised in the initials “TV”, which stand for TRENTINO Volley.

Team
Team roster – season 2022/2023

Coach history

Notable players

 1999–2001 Enrique de la Fuente
 2000–2001 Igor Shulepov
 2000–2002 Konstantin Ushakov
 2000–2002 Slobodan Boškan
 2000–2002 Đula Mešter
 2001–2005 Paolo Tofoli
 2002–2003 Igor Vušurović
 2002–2004 Lorenzo Bernardi
 2002–2004 Aleksey Kazakov
 2002–2005 Andrea Sartoretti
 2004–2005 Goran Vujević
 2004–2007 André Heller
 2005–2006 Ryan Millar
 2005–2007 André Nascimento
 2005–2007 Marco Meoni
 2006–2009 Michał Winiarski
 2007–2008 Vladimir Nikolov
 2007–2009 Nikola Grbić
 2007–2013, 2014–2015 Matey Kaziyski
 2007–2015 Emanuele Birarelli
 2008–2010 Leandro Vissotto
 2008–2012, 2014–2015 Łukasz Żygadło
 2009–2010, 2010–2013 Osmany Juantorena
 2009–2012, 2013–2014 Tsvetan Sokolov
 2009–2013 Raphael Vieira de Oliveira
 2010–2011 Valentin Bratoev
 2010–2017 Massimo Colaci
 2011–2016 Filippo Lanza
 2012–2021 Simone Giannelli
 2016–2018 Jenia Grebennikov

Individual records

Stadium

The PalaTrento arena has always been the place where the club's at home games have been disputed, ever since its opening in 2000 during the first at home game in the history of Trentino Volley (Itas Diatec Trentino-European Padua 3–2 on 22 October 2000), The arena is in the south of the city of Trento on the Ghiaie sport groundsthat also includes the PalaGhiaccio, a football field, and a ballpark.

Kit providers
The table below shows the history of kit providers for the Trentino team.

Sponsorship
Primary sponsors include: main sponsors like Diatec Group other sponsors: Volkswagen, Consorzio Melinda, Dorigoni Trento, Scania, Mediocredito Italiano, McDonald's, Intesa Sanpaolo, Marzadro Distillery, Südtiroler Volksbank, Grand Hotel Trento, Sparco, Forst, Superpoli, Menz & Gasser and Policura.

Notes

References

External links
 Official website 
 Official website 
 Team profile at Volleybox.net

Italian volleyball clubs
Sport in Trentino
Trento
Volleyball clubs established in 2000
2000 establishments in Italy